Neerijnen is a village and former municipality in the Netherlands.

On 1 January 2019, it merged with Geldermalsen and Lingewaal to form the new municipality of West Betuwe.

History 
It was first mentioned in 996 as in Ine. The etymology in unclear. It is neer (lower) in comparison with Opijnen (upper). The village developed as an esdorp perpendicular to the dike of the Waal.

Neerijnen Castle was built around 1350 and formed a single estate with Waardenburg Castle. In 1574, it was under siege by William the Silent and mainly destroyed. The castle was rebuilt in 1627. In 1980, it served as town hall. In 2019, Neerijnen merged into West Betuwe, and the castle was put up for sale.

In 1840, it was home to 294 people. The Dutch Reformed Church was built in 1865.

Former population centres 
 Est
 Haaften
 Heesselt
 Hellouw
 Neerijnen
 Ophemert
 Opijnen
 Tuil
 Varik
 Waardenburg

Topography

Dutch Topographic map of the municipality of Neerijnen, June 2015

Gallery

References

External links 
 
 Official website

West Betuwe
Former municipalities of Gelderland
Populated places in Gelderland
Municipalities of the Netherlands disestablished in 2019